The women's 10,000 metres event featured at the 1993 World Championships in Stuttgart, Germany. There were a total number of 42 participating athletes, with two qualifying heats and the final being held on 21 August 1993.

The race was conducted in almost 30 °C temperatures, but the Chinese team took the race out at a pace only seen once before, during Ingrid Kristiansen's world record race 5 years earlier.  Zhong Huandi took the pace for her 20 year old country mate Wang Junxia, while the others struggled to keep up.  15 year old Sally Barsosio stayed close to the pace, but her inexperience and erratic movements disrupted the flow for several runners near her.  At one point during the race she was shown a yellow card by an umpire to essentially tell her to get out of the way.  After getting spiked too many times from Barsosio's back kick, Elana Meyer walked off the track.  The fast pace eventually slowed mid-race, then in frustration, Wang took off, separating from the chase pack of Zhong, Barsosio and Tegla Loroupe.  Wang began dropping her lap times progressively 72, 71, 70, 69, 68.  She capped it off with a 61 final lap for a championship record 30:49.30.  Half a lap back, Barsosio had edged ahead of with Loroupe unable to maintain the pace and fading, then Zhong launched into a sprint the loping Barsosio could not match, pulling away to a three second gap for silver.  After the race, Barsosio was disqualified, only to be reinstated on appeal.  A little over two weeks later, Wang demolished the world record, running 29:31.78, part of a record smashing National Games of China when three major women's distance records were set.  Wang's 10,000 record lasted until the  2016 Olympics when it was smashed by Ethiopian Almaz Ayana.  Her 3000 metres record from 1993 has never been beaten.  4th place in that 1993 Chinese race is still the #4 time in history.  In 2016, a letter written by Wang in 1995 was published where she is said to have admitted to herself and her Liaoning teammates doping.  Zhong trained with a different group in Yunnan.  Four years later Barsosio won this race as a 19 year old.

Final

Qualifying heats
Held on Thursday 1993-08-19

See also
 1990 Women's European Championships 10,000 metres (Split)
 1991 Women's World Championships 10,000 metres (Tokyo)
 1992 Women's Olympic 10,000 metres (Barcelona)
 1994 Women's European Championships 10,000 metres (Helsinki)
 1995 Women's World Championships 10,000 metres (Gothenburg)
 1996 Women's Olympic 10,000 metres (Atlanta)

References
 Results

 
10,000 metres at the World Athletics Championships
1993 in women's athletics